The Indian Cavalry Corps was formed 18 December 1914.

Command
Commander Lieutenant-General Michael Rimington
Brigadier-General General Staff H.J.M. Macandrew
Brigadier-General Royal Artillery R St C Leeky

Corps Troops
Jodhpur Lancers
1st Indian Signal Squadron
Jodhpur Cavalry Field Ambulance

1st Indian Cavalry Division
Arrived in France 7 November 1914
Major-General M.F. Rimington
Major-General H.D. Fanshawe from 22 December 1914
GSO 1 Lieutenant-Colonel H.J.M. Macandrew
Lieutenant-Colonel R. O'Bryan Taylor from 26 December 1914
Commander Royal Horse Artillery Colonel R St C Leeky
Lieutenant-Colonel H Rouse from 11 December 1914
Commander Royal Engineers Colonel C E Baddeley
Lieutenant-Colonel C A J Leslie from 11 December 1914

2nd (Sialkot) Cavalry Brigade
Brigadier-General H.P. Leader
 17th (Duke of Cambridge's Own) Lancers
 6th King Edward's Own Cavalry
 19th Lancers (Fane's Horse)
 Signal Troop

3rd (Ambala) Cavalry Brigade

Major-General C.P.W. Pirie
 8th (King's Royal Irish) Hussars
 9th Hodson's Horse
 30th Lancers (Gordon's Horse) 
 Signal Troop

8th (Lucknow) Cavalry Brigade
Major-General G.A. Cookson
Brigadier-General W.H. Fasken from 9 December 1914
 1st King's Dragoon Guards
 29th Lancers (Deccan Horse)
 36th Jacob's Horse
 Signal Troop

1st Indian Cavalry Division Troops
I Indian Brigade, Royal Horse Artillery
A Battery, RHA
Q Battery, RHA
U Battery, RHA
I Indian Brigade Ammunition Column
B Section
C Section
G Section 
2nd Indian Field Troop Royal Engineers
2nd Indian Signal Squadron
1st Indian Supply Column
Sialkot Field Ambulance
Ambala Field Ambulance
Lucknow Field Ambulance

2nd Indian Cavalry Division

Arrived in France 14 December 1914
Commander Major-General G.A. Cookson
GSO 1 Lieutenant-Colonel L.C. Jones
Commander Royal Horse Artillery Lieutenant-Colonel H F Askwith
Commander Royal Engineers Lieutenant-Colonel H J M Marshall

5th (Mhow) Cavalry Brigade
Colonel  M E Willoughby 
 6th (Inniskilling) Dragoons
 2nd Lancers (Gardner's Horse)
 38th King George's Own Central India Horse
 Signal troop

7th (Meerut) Cavalry Brigade
Brigadier-General FitzJ.M. Edwards
 13th Hussars
 3rd Skinner's Horse
 18th King George's Own Tiwana Lancers 
 Signal Troop

9th (Secunderabad) Cavalry Brigade
Arrived in France with the Indian Corps 12 October 1914 attached Indian Cavalry Corps 23 December 1914.
Brigadier-General F.W.G. Wadeson
 7th (Princess Royal's) Dragoon Guards
 20th Deccan Horse
 34th Prince Albert Victor's Own Poona Horse
 Signal Troop

2nd Indian Cavalry Division Troops
II Indian Brigade, Royal Horse Artillery
N Battery, RHA, arrived in France with the 9th (Secunderabad) Cavalry Brigade
V Battery, RHA
X Battery, RHA
II Brigade Ammunition Column
E Section arrived 5 January 1915
F Section arrived 5 January 1915
H Section
1st Indian Field Troop Royal Engineers
3rd Indian Signal Squadron
2nd Indian Cavalry Supply Column
Mhow Cavalry Field Ambulance
Meerut Cavalry Field Ambulance
Secunderabad Cavalry Field Ambulance, arrived in France with the 9th (Secunderabad) Cavalry Brigade

See also
British Cavalry Corps order of battle 1914

References

Bibliography
Edmunds, J.E. (1925). History of the Great War. Military Operations, France and Belgium 1914. History of the Great War. Volume II. Macmillan & Co. 

Corps of British India
Corps of India in World War I
Military units and formations established in 1914
Military units and formations disestablished in 1916
World War I orders of battle